Monster Munch is a clone of Pac-Man programmed by Mark Trotter for the Commodore 64. It was published by Atlantis Software in 1983.

Gameplay
The player must guide the character of "Munchie" around the maze so that he eats all of the white dots. Munchie is pursued by monsters, which cause the character to be killed by a bolt of lightning, losing one of three lives. Eating a flashing power pill turns the monsters blue, during which time Munchie is able to eat them for bonus points. A question mark occasionally appears, which can be eaten for a mystery bonus. When all the dots are eaten, the player is presented with a new, more dangerous screen.

Reception

References

External links
Monster Munch at Gamebase64

1983 video games
Commodore 64 games
Commodore 64-only games
Pac-Man clones
Video games about food and drink
Video games developed in the United Kingdom

Single-player video games
Atlantis Software games